Left in Darkness is a 2006 horror film produced by  IDT Entertainment, and Soul Eaters Productions Inc. The film stars Monica Keena, David Anders, Jessica Stroup, and Travis Van Winkle.

Plot
A young woman, whose mother died giving birth to her, is facing eternal life in either Heaven or Hell. She must make the choice whom to listen to, her guardian angel, whom she met when she was a child, or the evil ones.

Cast
 Monica Keena
 David Anders
 Jessica Stroup
 Travis Van Winkle
 Tim Thomerson
 Tarah Paige
 Chelsea Cannell
 Shane Bitney Crone
 Jeridan Frye
 Marisa Lauren
 Justin Spraggins

References

External links 
 
 Rotten Tomatoes
 Flixster
 

2006 films
American horror films
2000s English-language films
2000s American films